is a Japanese football player currently playing for Roasso Kumamoto.

Career statistics
Updated to 23 February 2018.

1Includes J1 Promotion Playoffs.

References

External links
Profile at Roasso Kumamoto
Profile at Kyoto Sanga

1987 births
Living people
Kokushikan University alumni
Association football people from Hokkaido
Japanese footballers
J1 League players
J2 League players
J3 League players
Montedio Yamagata players
Ehime FC players
Kyoto Sanga FC players
Roasso Kumamoto players
Association football midfielders
Sportspeople from Sapporo